The Cramer family is a family of fictional characters on the  American soap opera One Life to Live. The family centers on the relationships of long-running character Dr. Dorian Cramer, who debuts on the series in April 1973.

The long-running feud between antagonist Dorian Cramer and original series heroine and one-time stepdaughter Victoria "Viki" Lord (Erika Slezak) is central to the series plot for 40 years. Dorian and Victoria are considered "frenemies" and share relatives through the marriages and ongoing relationship of Victoria's brother and Dorian's niece Todd Manning and Blair Cramer. Todd, Blair and their daughter Starr Manning crossover to sister soap opera General Hospital from February 2012 through March 2013.

Generations

First generation
 Louis Michael "Lou" Cramer (Peter Galman)  Born off-screen November 25, 1917; dies onscreen in flashbacks August 27, 1960. Brother of Betsy.
 Betsy Cramer (Lois Smith)  Born off-screen in 1920s; dies onscreen February 24, 2004. Sister of Lou.

Second generation
 Agatha "Addie" Cramer (Pamela Payton-Wright)  Born off-screen May 1, 1941, to Lou Cramer and Sonia Roskova Cramer.
 Dorian Cramer (Nancy Pinkerton, Claire Malis, Robin Strasser, Elaine Princi)  Born off-screen July 12, 1946, to Lou Cramer and Sonya Roskova Cramer.
 Melinda Cramer (Patricia Pearcy, Jane Badler, Sharon Gabet, Nicole Orth-Pallavicini)  Born off-screen 1948 to Lou Cramer and Sonya Roskova Cramer; dies off-screen 2010.

Third generation
 Cassandra "Cassie" Reynolds (Cusi Cram, Ava Haddad, Holly Gagnier, Laura Koffman)  Born off-screen September 11, 1968 then revised to 1967 to Dorian Cramer and David Reynolds.
 Blair Cramer (Mia Korf, Kassie DePaiva)  Born off-screen October 23, 1969, to Addie Cramer and unnamed father.
 Kelly Cramer (Gina Tognoni, Tracy Melchior, Heather Tom)  Born off-screen 1977 to Melinda Cramer and unnamed father; birth year changed to 1975 as of 2010.
 Paul Cramer (Brock Cuchna, David Tom, Shane McRae)  Born off-screen circa 1982 to Melinda Cramer and unnamed father; dies onscreen October 27, 2004.
 Adriana Cramer (Amanda Cortinas, Melissa Fumero)  Born off-screen May 27, 1988, then revised to 1987 to Dorian Cramer Lord and Manuel Santi, adopted by Cesar Colón and Ramona Colón.
 Langston Wilde (Brittany Underwood)  Born off-screen in 1992 then revised to 1991 Broderick Wilde and Linda Montez Wilde, adopted by Dorian Cramer Lord.

Fourth generation
 William Sloan "River" Carpenter III (Matthew Twining and child actors)  Born onscreen December 24, 1993, to Beth Garvey and unnamed father, adopted by Cassie Callison and Andrew Carpenter; birth year changed to 1985 as of 2003.
 Starr Manning (Kristen Alderson and child actors)  Born onscreen January 8, 1996, to Blair Cramer Manning and Todd Manning; birth year changed to 1992 as of 1998 then to 1990 as 2013.
 John "Jack" Cramer Manning (Carmen LoPorto, Andrew Trischitta, and child actors)  Born onscreen October 11, 2001, to Blair Cramer Manning and Todd Manning; birth year changed to 1997 as of 2007 then to 1995 as of 2011.
 Samuel "Sam" Manning (Patrick Gibbons, Jr. and others)  Born onscreen February 5, 2006, to Todd Manning (as played by Trevor St. John and retconned to Victor Lord, Jr. as of 2011) and Margaret Cochran, adopted by Blair Cramer; birth year changed to 2004 as of 2010.
 Zane Buchanan (child actors)  Born onscreen October 31, 2006, then to 1995 as of 2010 Kelly Cramer and Duke Buchanan.

Fifth generation
 Hope Manning-Thornhart (child actors)  Born onscreen November 6, 2008, to Starr Manning and Cole Thornhart; presumed dead in General Hospital crossover February 28, 2012.

Overview

Enter Dorian and Melinda

Dr. Dorian Cramer arrives in Llanview on April 30, 1973 with unstable younger sister Melinda Cramer. Both of their parents are assumed dead in a plane crash en route to visit an injured Melinda, whose promising career as a pianist was ended by a fall that had paralyzed her arm (it is later revealed their mother survived). Having apparently lost a third sister to pneumonia, Dorian and Melinda are each other's only family.

Dorian treats Eileen Riley Siegel for her addiction to painkillers, and soon became romantically involved with Dr. Mark Toland, the husband of Eileen's daughter Julie Siegel Toland. A furious Melinda, who had also developed a crush on Mark, became further unhinged. When Melinda's plan to stab Dorian and Mark in bed fails in 1974, Dorian has her sister institutionalized.

Dorian and Mark are suspended from Llanview Hospital in 1974 for her involvement in the death of patient Rachel Wilson, and Dorian blames hospital board member Victoria "Viki" Lord Riley (who had actually voted in Dorian's favor) for the decision. She and Viki spar further when Dorian becomes the private physician to Viki's ailing father, Victor Lord, but their rivalry is cemented when Victor announces his elopement to Dorian in May 1975. Victor's long-lost son Tony Harris comes to town and Dorian, hoping to maintain her hold on Victor's fortune, soon manipulates events to make father and son bitter enemies. After Victor's mysterious death in 1976, the shadow of implicating suspicion surrounds Dorian for decades.

Blair's revenge

In 1991, former foster child Blair Daimler arrives in Llanview with a secret — she is the daughter of Dorian's previously unmentioned older sister Agatha "Addie" Cramer, who was not dead as previously assumed. Blair had Addie, mentally ill and institutionalized for years, hidden in her loft, and blamed her Aunt Dorian for her mother's illness. Seeking revenge, Blair tries to ruin Dorian by getting her aunt's signature on a document confessing to the murder of Victor Lord in 1976.

Blair seeks to marry Asa Buchanan to gain the financial security and the power she desired to care for her mother and destroy Dorian. As it was revealed, Dorian was told Addie had died by their parents, who actually institutionalized Addie. Blair marries Asa in spite of being in love with Max Holden; by the time her marriage fell apart to Asa had thrown her out of Buchanan mansion and Max moved on to date and marry Luna Moody.  In 1994, Blair becomes romantically involved with Todd Manning.

Kelly and Paul

In 1995, Melinda's rebellious daughter Kelly Cramer arrives in Llanview, scarred by her childhood with her unstable mother and raised in various European boarding schools arranged by her aunt Dorian. Kelly comes to live with her cousin Cassie and Cassie's husband Andrew, and develops an infatuation with Dorian's husband David Vickers. Over time, Kelly and her family become close. Later, Kelly falls for both Joey and Kevin Buchanan.

In 1997, Melinda is finally recovering from her breakdown, and remembering her and Dorian's traumatic past at the Cramer family hometown of Canton, Ohio. Dorian, desperate not to let the dark secrets of their past resurface, begins switching Melinda's antipsychotic medication, and Melinda once again sinks into dementia.

In 2003, it is revealed that Melinda had told Dorian upon a recent hospital visit that she had given birth to a son as well as a daughter during her years in Europe, and that the boy had been given away. This child turns out to be Paul Cramer.  Melinda is seen again in 2004 during the "baby switch" storyline, in which Kelly confesses her and Paul's sins to her delusional mother. A disoriented Melinda — lost in her own world — mistakes Kelly's son Ace for her own son Paul. A devious Paul is murdered in October 2004; One Life to Live was met with criticism when the killer was later revealed to be married district attorney Daniel Colson, who had murdered Paul to cover up the fact that Daniel is secretly gay. On March 1, 2010, the assembled family receives the news that Melinda has died of a heart attack.

Family tree

|-
|
|-
|

|-
|style="text-align: left;"|Notes:

|}

Descendants

|-
|style="text-align: left;"|
 Unnamed parents [deceased]
  c. Lou Cramer [deceased]
   m. Sonya Roskova (dissolved by his death) [deceased]
    c. Dorian Cramer
     a. David Reynolds [deceased]
      c. Cassie Callison (adopted by Herb Callison)
       m. Bo Buchanan (1991; invalid)
       m. Andrew Carpenter (1993–1997; divorced)
        c. William Sloan Carpenter [deceased 1993]
        ac. River Carpenter
       m. Kevin Buchanan (1998–1999; annulled)
     m. Victor Lord (1976–2003; dissolved by his death)
     m. Herb Callison (1981–1985; invalid)
     m. Manuel Santi (1980s; invalid; deceased)
      c. Adriana Cramer (adopted by César and Ramona Colón)
       m. Rex Balsom (2008; divorced)
     m. David Vickers (1995; divorced; first time)
     m. Mel Hayes (1998–1999; dissolved by his death)
     m. Mitch Laurence (2003; annulled)
      ac. Langston Wilde (biological daughter of Broderick Wilde & Linda Montez Wilde)
     m. David Vickers (2009; annulled; second time)
     m. David Vickers Buchanan (2011–present; third time)
    c. Melinda Cramer [deceased 2010]
     a. Unknown
      c. Kelly Cramer
       m. Joey Buchanan (2000–2001; divorced)
       m. Kevin Buchanan (2003–2004; divorced)
        c. Kevin Buchanan, Jr. [stillborn 2004]
       a. Duke Buchanan [deceased]
        c. Zane Buchanan
     m. Peter Janssen (1978–1981; annulled)
     a. Unknown
      c. Paul Cramer [died 2004]
       m. Babe Carey (2003–2004; annulled; deceased)
    c. Addie Cramer
     r. Unknown
      c. Blair Cramer
       m. Asa Buchanan (1992; divorced; deceased)
       m. Todd Manning (1995; annulled; first time)
       m. Todd Manning (1995–1997; divorced; second time)
        c. Starr Manning (born 1996)
         a. Cole Thornhart [assumed dead 2012]
          c. Hope Manning-Thornhart (born 2008, assumed dead 2012)
       a. Patrick Thornhart
        c. Brendan Thornhart [stillborn 1997]
       m. Max Holden (1999–2001; divorced)
       m. Todd Manning (2001–2002; divorced; third time)
        c. Jack Manning (born 2001)
       m. Victor Lord, Jr. (2003–2004; annulled; first time)
       m. Victor Lord, Jr. (2007–2008; divorced; second time)
        ac. Sam Manning (Margaret Cochran's son with Victor Lord Jr.; born 2006)
       m. John McBain (2009; divorced)
       m. Elijah Clarke (2010; dissolved by his death)
       m. Todd Manning (2013–present; fourth time)
     m. David Vickers (2008; annulled)
   c. Betsy Cramer [died 2004]
|-
|style="text-align: left;"|Notes
|-
|style="text-align: left;"|

References

External links
 Cramer family tree – ABC.com
 Cramer family tree – SoapCentral.com

One Life to Live families
One Life to Live characters
Fictional characters from Ohio